Consulting-Specifying Engineer is a trade publication and website owned by CFE Media, serving the information needs of engineering personnel who perform various consulting engineering activities.

The magazine is published monthly and covers Consulting-Specifying Engineering subjects, such as: Mechanical, Electrical, Plumbing, Lighting, Fire and Life Safety, and Controls/BAS Engineering. Other subject areas include Career and Engineering trends, Codes and Standards, and Convention coverage.

Consulting-Specifying Engineer publishes several programs throughout each year:
40 Under 40 - A program which features 40 consulting-specifying engineers under the age of 40.
MEP Giants - A program which ranks the 100 largest mechanical/electrical/plumbing consulting firms in the United States.
Product of the Year - A program which receives products from ten categories across the Consulting-Specifying field and allows for readers to vote for their favorites.

History
Consulting-Specifying Engineer has existed since 1987 in its current form, a combination of two monthly, older publications: Consulting Engineer (dating back to 1952) and Actual Specifying Engineer (to 1958).

In April 2010, former owner Reed Business Information announced the magazine's closure; later that month, Control Engineering, Consulting-Specifying Engineer and Plant Engineering were acquired by a new company, CFE Media LLC.

, total BPA circulation was 46,714 engineer subscribers employed by consulting, engineer/architectural, design/build firms, or in-house engineers.

References
BPA Worldwide

External links
Consulting-Specifying Engineer website
CFE Media LLC website

Business magazines published in the United States
Monthly magazines published in the United States
Engineering magazines
Magazines established in 1952
Magazines published in Illinois
Professional and trade magazines